This is a list of U.S. state and territory plants and botanical gardens — plants and botanical gardens which have been designated as an official symbol(s) by a state or territory's legislature. 5 U.S. states and 1 U.S. territory have an official state/territory plant. 7 U.S. states have an official state botanical garden or arboretum. This list excludes state flowers, state trees, and state grasses.

State and territory plants

State botanical gardens and arboretums

Other state plant designations

State lei-making material
In addition to Hawaii's state plant, Hawaii has official state flowers and lei-making material for the individual islands of Hawaii:

See also
List of U.S. state and territory flowers
List of U.S. state and territory trees
List of U.S. state grasses
Lists of U.S. state insignia
Lists of U.S. state symbols
Arbor Day Foundation

References

plants